The rich iconography of Charlemagne is a reflection of Charlemagne's special position in Europe's collective memory, as the greatest of the Frankish kings, first Holy Roman Emperor, unifier of Western Europe, protector of the Catholic Church, promoter of education and of the Carolingian Renaissance, fictional precursor of the crusades, one of the Nine Worthies, a (contested) Saint, and a national icon in Andorra, Belgium, France and Germany.

Appearance

The Vita Karoli Magni written after Charlemagne's death by his servant Einhard has served ever since as a reference establishing his stature and charisma:

Beard

Contemporaneous depictions of Charlemagne and related rulers suggest he sported a mustache, but not a beard. The motif of Charlemagne's beard appears in 11th-century chansons de geste and especially the Song of Roland, which has a verse describing Charlemagne: "Blanche ad la barbe et tut flurit le chef", which translates as "his beard is white, and all his hair is greying." The expression "l'empereur à la barbe fleurie" came to refer specifically to Charlemagne in French, and was further popularized by Victor Hugo in a 1846 poem of la Légende des siècles: 

The epithet "fleuri" in this context appears to have meant "greyish-white", alluding to Charlemagne's old age - even though he was actually under 40 at the time of the historical battle of Roncevaux Pass. An alternative view is that the poem refers to Charlemagne's beard being kept unshaven during the arduous military campaign.

In any case, the beard has remained a near-constant attribute of Charlemagne since the High Middle Ages, and a long white beard associated with his old age. A rare exception is his depiction in the fresco of the Coronation of Charlemagne in the Raphael Rooms of the Apostolic Palace, since this was made a likeness of Francis I of France for political reasons, and Francis was beardless at the time. Some 20th- or 21st-century depictions of Charlemagne also show him beardless for historical accuracy.

Attire

Charlemagne has been generally depicted in military or ceremonial garb, with the style varying across time - typically, contemporary or at least recent in the Middle Ages and early modern period; ancient Roman in the 18th century; and aiming at historicist accuracy in the 19th century. He is often shown carrying, in his left hand, a globus cruciger, and in his right hand, either a sword (sometimes modeled on his attributed Joyeuse) or a scepter; from the 17th century the latter has tended, at least in France, to be the scepter of Charles V then known as "scepter of Charlemagne". In images where Charlemagne is crowned, the crown is in some instances the Imperial Crown of the Holy Roman Empire, as in Albrecht Dürer's seminal portrait now in Nuremberg, or the coronation crown of the kings of France also known as Crown of Charlemagne, as in the Mass of Saint Giles now in London. In many other depictions, however, the crown does not refer to a specific existing object.

Heraldry

In the Holy Roman Empire, the Imperial eagle (Reichsadler) emblem was attributed retroactively to Charlemagne, at the latest at the time of his reburial under Emperor Frederick II in 1215. Meanwhile, following the marriage of Isabella of Hainault with Philip II of France in 1180, the French Capetian dynasty promoted its own claims to the memory and legacy of Charlemagne, including by linking him to the fleur-de-lis. 

The heraldic combination of the two shields, by either dimidiation (i.e. with only a half-Reichsadler on the "German" side) or more rarely impalement (full Reichsadler), is first attested in a poem of Ogier's Youth (Les Enfances Ogier) by Adenes Le Roi in the last third of the 13th century. This adaptation became accepted in France and in the Empire as well, thanks to the fleur-de-lis's symbolic and mythical association not only with the Capetians but also with their Frankish predecessors. 

In line with the prevailing conventions of precedence among European monarchies, French depictions generally placed the Imperial eagle on the more honorable left-hand half of the shield (worn on the right-hand side when displayed on Charlemagne's coat), as was naturally done in the Empire.

Public monuments

Charlemagne was represented from medieval times in public settings including churches and civic landmarks. These include, among numerous others, the stucco statue of Charlemagne inside Saint John Abbey, Müstair (Switzerland), of uncertain date between the 9th and 12th centuries; a statue above the entrance of Osnabrück Town Hall; and a prominent 15th-century statue on one of the towers of the Grossmünster in Zürich (the original is now in the crypt, and a copy by Otto Münch was replaced on the tower in 1933). 

From the early modern era, several free-standing statues of Charlemagne were created for prominent public locations for various political purposes, including: 
 The statue of Charlemagne in Aachen (Peter and Frans von Trier, 1620); the original is now in the  museum, and a 1969 copy replaced on the Marktplatz in front of Aachen Town Hall
 The equestrian statue of Charlemagne under the portico of St. Peter's Basilica (Agostino Cornacchini, 1725) 
 The statue of Charlemagne on the Alte Brücke in Frankfurt (1843); the original is now at the Historical Museum, and a copy was re-erected on the bridge in 2016
 The statue of Charlemagne in Liège (Louis Jehotte, 1867)
 The bronze group of Charlemagne et ses Leudes in front of Notre-Dame de Paris (Louis and Charles Rochet, 1878) 
 The equestrian statue of Charlemagne on Keizer Karelplein in Nijmegen (1960)

Gallery

Notes

Cultural depictions of Charlemagne
Charlemagne